The 2014 Cincinnati Bengals season was the franchise's 45th season in the National Football League, the 47th overall and the twelfth under head coach Marvin Lewis. The Bengals qualified for the playoffs for the 4th consecutive season, but lost to the Indianapolis Colts in the first round, extending their playoff losing streak to 7 games, the 3rd longest losing streak (in terms of games played) in NFL history at the time, behind the Detroit Lions and Kansas City Chiefs who both had 8.

2014 draft class

Draft trades
 The Bengals traded their original fourth- and sixth-round selections (Nos. 123 and 199 overall, respectively) to the Seattle Seahawks in exchange for the Seahawks' fourth-round selection (No. 111 overall).

Staff

Final roster

Schedule

Preseason

Regular season

Note: Intra-division opponents are in bold text.

Postseason

Game summaries

Regular season

Week 1: at Baltimore Ravens
Andy Dalton would throw a 77-yard touchdown pass to A. J. Green with 4:58 remaining to give the Bengals the win. With the win, the Bengals started 1-0. They also won at Baltimore for the first time since 2009.

Week 2: vs. Atlanta Falcons
The Bengals defense would have themselves a day, intercepting Falcons quarterback Matt Ryan 3 times in the win. With the win, the Bengals started 2-0 for the first time since 2006.

Week 3: vs. Tennessee Titans

With the win, the Bengals started 3-0 for the first time since 2006.  It is also their 3rd 3-0 start under Marvin Lewis.

Week 5: at New England Patriots
With the loss, the Bengals fell to 3-1.

Week 6: vs. Carolina Panthers

With the tie, the Bengals were sent to a 3-1-1 record and were given their first tie game since 2008.

Week 7: at Indianapolis Colts
With the loss, the Bengals fell to 3-2-1. They were also shut out for the first time since 2009.

Week 8: vs. Baltimore Ravens
With the win, the Bengals improved to 4-2-1, and swept the Ravens for the first time since 2009.

Week 9: vs. Jacksonville Jaguars
With their 4th straight win over the Jaguars, the Bengals went to 5-2-1.

Week 10: vs. Cleveland Browns
Andy Dalton would post a quarterback rating (QBR) of 2.0 in this game, as the Bengals went down easily to the Browns 24-3. With the loss, the Bengals fell to 5-3-1.

Week 11: at New Orleans Saints
With the win, the Bengals went to 6-3-1.

Week 12: at Houston Texans
With the win, the Bengals went to 7-3-1.

Week 13: at Tampa Bay Buccaneers
With the win, the Bengals went to 8-3-1. They also won 3 consecutive road games for the first time in franchise history. They also defeated the Bucs for the first time since 1989.

Week 14: vs. Pittsburgh Steelers
The Bengals would surrender 25 points in the 4th quarter in this loss. With the loss, the Bengals fell to 8-4-1.

Week 15: at Cleveland Browns
Johnny Manziel made his first career NFL start in this game. With the shutout win, the Bengals went to 9-4-1. They also posted their first shutout win since 2008 (also against the Browns).

Week 16: vs. Denver Broncos
The Bengals defense would intercept Peyton Manning 4 times in the game, including 2 by Dre Kirkpatrick in the 4th quarter. With the win, the Bengals improved to 10-4-1. They also defeated Peyton Manning for the first time.

Week 17: at Pittsburgh Steelers
With the loss, the Bengals ended their season at 10-5-1. They would also finish in 2nd place by virtue of not only the Steelers sweep, but also being 1 game behind.

Postseason

AFC Wild Card Playoffs: at (4) Indianapolis Colts

With the loss, the Bengals now endure their 7th straight playoff loss dating back to 1990.

Standings

Division

Conference

References

External links
 

Cincinnati
Cincinnati Bengals seasons
Cincinnati Bengals